"Space Song" is a song by American dream pop duo Beach House, released in 2015 as a promotional single from their fifth studio album, Depression Cherry. In 2022, the song was certified Silver in the UK by the British Phonographic Industry (BPI).

Release 
"Space Song" became a sleeper hit after going viral on TikTok in early 2021. According to Spotify for Artists, it is used "as a way to show dramatic irony – emphasis on the dramatic." As of September 2022, the song has been used in over 200,000 videos on the platform. In an interview with Pitchfork, Beach House member Victoria Legrand said of the success of "Space Song" on TikTok:I don't need to analyze it because I'm grateful for it. I don’t think it's just that song, but if that is the gateway, then I'm happy about it. We both feel lucky that younger people keep discovering us and we're able to keep making records.As of September 2022, the song has been streamed over 500 million times on Spotify. In December 2022, the song saw a 41% increase in streams after being featured in the third episode of the Netflix original series Wednesday.

Critical reception 
Pitchfork labeled "Space Song" a "sweeping mid-album highlight". Heather Phares of AllMusic described "Space Song" as a moment where Beach House "conjures a feeling of intimacy surrounded by vastness", with "arpeggiated keyboards suggesting stars shooting through an endless sky".

Composition 
"Space Song" is 5 minutes and 20 seconds in length, written at 147 beats per minute in a  time signature, and in the key of C minor.

Charts

Certifications

References 

2015 songs
Beach House songs
Songs written by Victoria Legrand